Cismar Abbey was a Benedictine monastery located at Cismar near Grömitz, Schleswig-Holstein, in Germany.

History
The abbey was founded in 1238 by Count Adolf IV of Holstein as alternative accommodation for Benedictine monks from Lübeck. In the mid-15th century it was one of the six original members of the influential Bursfelde Congregation, a Benedictine reform movement.  After three prosperous centuries, based largely on its possession of a relic of the blood of Christ and a healing spring dedicated to John the Baptist, which made it a centre of pilgrimage, it was dissolved in 1561 during the secularisation brought about by the Reformation. The monastic library is preserved in the Danish Royal Library in Copenhagen.

The Brick Gothic abbey church is famous for its carved altar, dating from the early 14th century, still in place in the church.

The other surviving buildings, after a wide variety of secular uses, now serve as a museum.

References

External links
Förderkreis Kloster Cismar e.V.: information about Cismar Abbey 

Benedictine monasteries in Germany
Monasteries in Schleswig-Holstein
1230s establishments in the Holy Roman Empire
1238 establishments in Europe
Religious organizations established in the 1230s
Christian monasteries established in the 13th century
Museums in Schleswig-Holstein
Religious museums in Germany
Lutheran churches in Schleswig-Holstein
Lutheran churches converted from Roman Catholicism
Brick Gothic
Gothic architecture in Germany